New Kingston Historic District is a national historic district located at New Kingston in Delaware County, New York. The district contains 44 contributing buildings and four contributing structures.  It encompasses nearly all of the small, unincorporated hamlet of New Kingston.

It was listed on the National Register of Historic Places in 2008.

See also
National Register of Historic Places listings in Delaware County, New York

References

National Register of Historic Places in Delaware County, New York
Historic districts on the National Register of Historic Places in New York (state)
Georgian architecture in New York (state)
Historic districts in Delaware County, New York